is a Japanese voice actress, lyricist, and composer from Kyoto.

Biography

Koiwai was born in Kyoto on February 15, 1990. She initially took interest in voice acting after hearing the voice of Pikachu in the Pokémon anime. Afterwards, after working as a make-up model and as a narrator while still in high school, she became a voice actress. 

Her debut as a voice actress was in 2011 in the anime Blue Exorcist.

Koiwai is also a songwriter and a lyricist. She writes songs and lyrics for voice actress Rie Tanaka. She also wrote the song and lyrics for a song for Idolmaster Million Live! that she also performs herself.

In 2019, she announced that she had been accepted into Mensa.

In 2020, she started doing ASMR streams and created her own ASMR Label: Kotoneiro.

Filmography

Anime
2011
 Blue Exorcist (Yoshikuni)

2012
 Psycho-Pass (Yuki Funahara)
 Joshiraku (Kigurumi Harōkitei)

2013
 Day Break Illusion (Minori Murakami)
 Fantasista Doll (Medallia, Proto-Zero, Rembrandt, Sonnet, Suzuri, Ukiwa)
 Gatchaman Crowds (Utsutsu Miya)
 Gingitsune (Fuku)
 Non Non Biyori (Renge Miyauchi)
 Sunday Without God (Gigi Totogi, Jiji)
 The Severing Crime Edge (Iwai Mushanokōji)

2014
 Barakamon (Aiko Kōmoto)
 Captain Earth (Mia, Pitz)
 M3: Sono Kuroki Hagane (Sasame Izuriha, Tsugumi)
 Magica Wars (Mebuki Konoe)
 Mekakucity Actors (Hiyori Asahina)
 Saki: The Nationals (Maho Yumeno)
 Soul Eater Not! (Kana Altair)
 The Seven Deadly Sins (Elaine)

2015
 Aikatsu! (Nono Daichi)
 Charlotte (Konishi)
 Gatchaman Crowds: insight (Utsutsu Miya)
 Nisekoi: (Suzu Ayakaji)
 Non Non Biyori Repeat (Renge Miyauchi)
 The Rolling Girls (Tsuruha)

2016
 Mob Psycho 100 (Mari)
 Tanaka-kun Is Always Listless (Shiraishi)

2017
 Blue Exorcist: Kyoto Saga (Kinoshita, Young Konekomaru)
 KiraKira Pretty Cure A La Mode (Emiru Kodama)
 Chain Chronicle: Light of Haecceitas (Juliana)

2018
 Teasing Master Takagi-san (Mano)
 The Seven Deadly Sins: Revival of The Commandments (Elaine)
 Goblin Slayer (Wizard)

2019
 Pastel Memories (Saori Rokugou)
 Teasing Master Takagi-san 2 (Mano)
 After School Dice Club (Ren Shibusawa)
 Val × Love (Kururi Saotome)

2021
 Cute Executive Officer (Designer)
 Non Non Biyori Nonstop (Renge Miyauchi)
 Godzilla Singular Point (Yukie Kanoko)
 I've Been Killing Slimes for 300 Years and Maxed Out My Level (Kuku)

2022
 Teasing Master Takagi-san 3 (Mano)
 Bocchi the Rock! (PA-san)

2023
 The Legend of Heroes: Trails of Cold Steel – Northern War (Millium Orion)
D4DJ All Mix (Michiru Kaibara)

Other
2019
 Vocaloid  (MEIKA Hime & Mikoto)
2021
 NEUTRINO  (No.7)

Theatrical animation
Friends: Mononoke Shima no Naki (2011) (Gotchi & Kutchi)
Non Non Biyori Vacation (2018) (Renge Miyauchi)
 Teasing Master Takagi-san: The Movie (2022) (Mano)

Video games
2013
 The Idolmaster Million Live! (Tomoka Tenkubashi)
 The Legend of Heroes: Trails of Cold Steel (Millium Orion)
 Fantasista Doll (Suzuri, Proto-Zero, Sonnet)
 Mugen Souls Z (Tioni)

2014
 Hyperdevotion Noire: Goddess Black Heart (Lestra)
 Chain Chronicle (Various Arcana/Characters)
 Atelier Shallie: Alchemists of the Dusk Sea (Shallistera)
 The Legend of Heroes: Trails of Cold Steel II (Millium Orion)
 Granblue Fantasy (Daetta), (Goblin Mage)

2017
 The Legend of Heroes: Trails of Cold Steel III (Millium Orion)

2018 
 Blustone 2 (Tyltyl)

2020
 Azur Lane (Suzutsuki)

2021
 D4DJ Groovy Mix (Michiru Kaibara)
 Gate of Nightmares (Mei Fang, Mousse)

2022
 Genshin Impact (Yun Jin)

2023
 Da Capo 5 (Menoa Yasaka)
 Crymachina (Vida)

References

External links
  
  
 

1990 births
Living people
Voice actresses from Kyoto
Japanese video game actresses
Japanese voice actresses
Mensans